Time-division multiple access (TDMA) is a channel access method for shared-medium networks. It allows several users to share the same frequency channel by dividing the signal into different time slots. The users transmit in rapid succession, one after the other, each using its own time slot.  This allows multiple stations to share the same transmission medium (e.g. radio frequency channel) while using only a part of its channel capacity. Dynamic TDMA is a TDMA variant that dynamically reserves a variable number of time slots in each frame to variable bit-rate data streams, based on the traffic demand of each data stream.

TDMA is used in the digital 2G cellular systems such as Global System for Mobile Communications (GSM), IS-136, Personal Digital Cellular (PDC) and iDEN, and in the Digital Enhanced Cordless Telecommunications (DECT) standard for portable phones. TDMA was first used in satellite communication systems by Western Union in its Westar 3 communications satellite in 1979. It is now used extensively in satellite communications, combat-net radio systems, and passive optical network (PON) networks for upstream traffic from premises to the operator.

TDMA is a type of time-division multiplexing (TDM), with the special point that instead of having one transmitter connected to one receiver, there are multiple transmitters. In the case of the uplink from a mobile phone to a base station this becomes particularly difficult because the mobile phone can move around and vary the timing advance required to make its transmission match the gap in transmission from its peers.

Characteristics 
 Shares single carrier frequency with multiple users
 Non-continuous transmission makes handoff simpler
 Slots can be assigned on demand in dynamic TDMA
 Less stringent power control than CDMA due to reduced intra cell interference
 Higher synchronization overhead than CDMA
 Advanced equalization may be necessary for high data rates if the channel is "frequency selective" and creates Intersymbol interference
 Cell breathing (borrowing resources from adjacent cells) is more complicated than in CDMA
 Frequency/slot allocation complexity
 Pulsating power envelope: interference with other devices

In mobile phone systems

2G systems 
Most 2G cellular systems, with the notable exception of IS-95, are based on TDMA. GSM, D-AMPS, PDC, iDEN, and PHS are examples of TDMA cellular systems.

In the GSM system, the synchronization of the mobile phones is achieved by sending timing advance commands from the base station which instructs the mobile phone to transmit earlier and by how much.  This compensates for the propagation delay resulting from the light speed velocity of radio waves. The mobile phone is not allowed to transmit for its entire time slot, but there is a guard interval at the end of each time slot. As the transmission moves into the guard period, the mobile network adjusts the timing advance to synchronize the transmission.

Initial synchronization of a phone requires even more care.  Before a mobile transmits there is no way to actually know the offset required.  For this reason, an entire time slot has to be dedicated to mobiles attempting to contact the network; this is known as the random-access channel (RACH) in GSM.  The mobile attempts to broadcast at the beginning of the time slot, as received from the network.  If the mobile is located next to the base station, there will be no time delay and this will succeed.  If, however, the mobile phone is at just less than 35 km from the base station, the time delay will mean the mobile's broadcast arrives at the very end of the time slot.  In that case, the mobile will be instructed to broadcast its messages starting nearly a whole time slot earlier than would be expected otherwise.  Finally, if the mobile is beyond the 35 km cell range in GSM, then the RACH will arrive in a neighbouring time slot and be ignored.  It is this feature, rather than limitations of power, that limits the range of a GSM cell to 35 km when no special extension techniques are used.  By changing the synchronization between the uplink and downlink at the base station, however, this limitation can be overcome.

3G systems 

Although most major 3G systems are primarily based upon CDMA, time-division duplexing (TDD), packet scheduling (dynamic TDMA) and packet oriented multiple access schemes are available in 3G form, combined with CDMA to take advantage of the benefits of both technologies.

While the most popular form of the UMTS 3G system uses CDMA and frequency-division duplexing (FDD) instead of TDMA, TDMA is combined with CDMA and time-division duplexing in two standard UMTS UTRA.

In wired networks 
The ITU-T G.hn standard, which provides high-speed local area networking over existing home wiring (power lines, phone lines and coaxial cables) is based on a TDMA scheme. In G.hn, a "master" device allocates "Contention-Free Transmission Opportunities" (CFTXOP) to other "slave" devices in the network. Only one device can use a CFTXOP at a time, thus avoiding collisions.
FlexRay protocol which is also a wired network used for safety-critical communication in modern cars, uses the TDMA method for data transmission control.

Comparison with other multiple-access schemes 
In radio systems, TDMA is usually used alongside frequency-division multiple access (FDMA) and frequency-division duplex (FDD); the combination is referred to as FDMA/TDMA/FDD.  This is the case in both GSM and IS-136 for example.  Exceptions to this include the DECT and Personal Handy-phone System (PHS) micro-cellular systems, UMTS-TDD UMTS variant, and China's TD-SCDMA, which use time-division duplexing, where different time slots are allocated for the base station and handsets on the same frequency.

A major advantage of TDMA is that the radio part of the mobile only needs to listen and broadcast for its own time slot.  For the rest of the time, the mobile can carry out measurements on the network, detecting surrounding transmitters on different frequencies.  This allows safe inter frequency handovers, something which is difficult in CDMA systems, not supported at all in IS-95 and supported through complex system additions in Universal Mobile Telecommunications System (UMTS).  This in turn allows for co-existence of microcell layers with macrocell layers.

CDMA, by comparison, supports "soft hand-off" which allows a mobile phone to be in communication with up to 6 base stations simultaneously, a type of "same-frequency handover".  The incoming packets are compared for quality, and the best one is selected. CDMA's "cell breathing" characteristic, where a terminal on the boundary of two congested cells will be unable to receive a clear signal, can often negate this advantage during peak periods.

A disadvantage of TDMA systems is that they create interference at a frequency which is directly connected to the time slot length.  This is the buzz which can sometimes be heard if a TDMA phone is left next to a radio or speakers.   Another disadvantage is that the "dead time" between time slots limits the potential bandwidth of a TDMA channel. These are implemented in part because of the difficulty in ensuring that different terminals transmit at exactly the times required. Handsets that are moving will need to constantly adjust their timings to ensure their transmission is received at precisely the right time, because as they move further from the base station, their signal will take longer to arrive. This also means that the major TDMA systems have hard limits on cell sizes in terms of range, though in practice the power levels required to receive and transmit over distances greater than the supported range would be mostly impractical anyway.

Dynamic TDMA 
In dynamic time-division multiple access (dynamic TDMA), a scheduling algorithm dynamically reserves a variable number of time slots in each frame to variable bit-rate data streams, based on the traffic demand of each data stream. Dynamic TDMA is used in

 HIPERLAN/2 broadband radio access network.
 IEEE 802.16a WiMax
 Bluetooth
 Military Radios / Tactical Data Link
 TD-SCDMA
 ITU-T G.hn
 Simulation of TDMA / DTMA links

See also 
 
 Link 16NATO military tactical data exchange network that uses TDMA

References 

Radio resource management
Media access control